Alla Volkova (born 1968) is a retired Russian football goalkeeper.

Volkova played during the 1999 and 2003 FIFA Women's World Cup.

References

1968 births
Living people
Russian women's footballers
Russia women's international footballers
1999 FIFA Women's World Cup players
2003 FIFA Women's World Cup players
Women's association football goalkeepers
FC Energy Voronezh players
FC Lada Togliatti (women) players
Russian Women's Football Championship players